Juhani Peltonen (born 16 June 1936) is a retired Finnish association football player.

Peltonen was the first Finnish player to play in the German Bundesliga. The forward made 38 appearances for Hamburger SV between 1964 and 1966, scoring six goals. His career in Germany ended after only two seasons because of contract disputes.

In Finland Peltonen always represented Valkeakosken Haka, winning two Finnish championships and five Finnish Cups with the club. For the Finnish national team he made 68 appearances, scoring 11 goals. He was chosen Finnish Player of the Year three times.

Career statistics

International

International goals
Scores and results list Finland's goal tally first.

Honours

Clubs
 Valkeakosken Haka
 Finnish Championship: 1960, 1962
 Finnish Cup: 1955, 1959, 1960, 1963, 1969

Individual
 Finnish Footballer of the Year: 1960, 1962, 1964

References

1936 births
Living people
People from Valkeakoski
Finnish footballers
Finland international footballers
Association football forwards
FC Haka players
Hamburger SV players
Bundesliga players
Mestaruussarja players
Finland B international footballers
Expatriate footballers in Germany
Sportspeople from Pirkanmaa